Baisari is a village in Banaripara Upazila, Bangladesh. Its coordinates are 

Baisari High School and Baisari College are located in the village.

Populated places in Barisal District